Giloloa is a monotypic genus of southeast Asian cellar spiders containing the single species, Giloloa sofifi. It was first described by B. A. Huber and L. S. Carvalho in 2019, and it has only been found in Indonesia.

See also
 List of Pholcidae species

References

Monotypic Pholcidae genera
Spiders of Indonesia